Martin Lepa (born 28 October 1976) is a retired football defender from Estonia. He played for several clubs in his native country, including FC Flora Tallinn, FC Kuressaare and JK Tulevik Viljandi.

International career
Lepa earned his first official cap for the Estonia national football team on 11 June, 1995, when Estonia played Slovenia in a qualifying match for Euro 1996. He obtained a total number of five caps for his native country.

References

1976 births
Living people
Estonian footballers
Estonia international footballers
Association football defenders
FC Kuressaare players
FC Flora players